Sheila Leah Fischman  (born 1 December 1937) is a Canadian translator who specializes in the translation of works of contemporary Quebec literature from French to English.

Born in Moose Jaw, Saskatchewan, she was brought up in Ontario.  She holds an M.A. from the University of Toronto. Fischman is a former editor of the Montreal Stars book section, as well as a columnist for The Globe and Mail and the Montreal Gazette and a broadcaster for CBC Radio. She is a founding member of the Literary Translators' Association of Canada and founding co-editor of Ellipse: Œuvres en traduction/Writers in Translation. She lives in Montreal.

Works
Fischman has translated nearly 150 Quebec novels into English, including works by such noted Quebec authors as Michel Tremblay, Hubert Aquin, Jacques Poulin, Suzanne Jacob, Anne Hébert, Marie-Claire Blais, Roch Carrier, Yves Beauchemin, Kim Thúy, Dominique Fortier and François Gravel.

Honours and citations
Since 1987, Fischman has received 14 nominations for the Governor General's Award for Translation, receiving the prize in 1998 for Bambi and Me, her translation of Michel Tremblay's Les vues animés. She has twice won the Canada Council Prize for Translation (in 1974 and 1984) and the Félix-Antoine Savard Award offered by the Translation Center, Columbia University, for Heartbreaks Along the Road by Roch Carrier (1989) and The First Garden by Anne Hébert (1990). Her translation of Pascale Quiviger's The Perfect Circle was a finalist for the 2006 Scotiabank Giller Prize and her translation of Am I Disturbing You by Anne Hébert was a finalist for the same prize in 2000. Four of Fischman's translations have been selected for Canada Reads: Next Episode by Hubert Aquin in 2003; Volkswagen Blues by Jacques Poulin in 2005; The Fat Woman Next Door is Pregnant by Michel Tremblay in 2009; and Ru by Kim Thúy in 2015. Her translations won the competition in 2003 and 2015.

In recognition of her work, Fischman has received honorary doctorates from the University of Ottawa and  the University of Waterloo. In 2000, she was invested into the Order of Canada and, in 2008, made a Knight of  the National Order of Quebec. She won the 2008 Molson Prize for the Arts.

References

External links
 Archives of Sheila Fischman (Sheila Fischman fonds, R11732) are held at Library and Archives Canada

1937 births
Living people
French–English translators
Members of the Order of Canada
Knights of the National Order of Quebec
People from Moose Jaw
University of Toronto alumni
Governor General's Award-winning translators
Literary translators
20th-century Canadian translators
21st-century Canadian translators